HD 100546, is a star 316.4 light-years from Earth. It is orbited by an approximately  exoplanet at 6.5 AU,  although further examination of the disk profile indicate it might be a more massive object such as a brown dwarf or more than one planet. The star is surrounded by a circumstellar disk from a distance of 0.2 to 4 AU, and again from 13 AU out to a few hundred AU, with evidence for a protoplanet forming at a distance of around 47 AU.

Estimated to be around 10 million years old, it is at the upper age limit of the class of stars it belongs to—Herbig Ae/Be stars, and also the nearest example to the Solar System.

Planetary system

Possible birth of new planet 

In 2013, researchers reported that they had found what seems to be a planet in the process of being formed, embedded in the star's large disc of gas and dust.  If confirmed, it would represent the first opportunity to study the early stages of planet formation observationally.

Evidence for a planetary companion to HD 100546 b was gathered using the UVES echelle spectrograph at the VLT in Chile. This confirms other data indicating a planetary companion.

However, the position where HD 100546 b was detected was inside compared with the gap between the inner and outer disks, and outside compared with the central cavity, so the validity of the planet was shown from the characteristics of the star disk. There was a discrepancy with the discussion. As a result of further detailed observation of the position where HD 100546 b was detected, the light source identified as HD 100546 b appeared to be a point light source in the analysis under specific conditions, but in many cases it became a more diffuse structure. Visible part may be not the planet itself, but the disturbance in disk caused by the much smaller (~10) planet completely embedded in the dust shroud. The presence of disturbance, possibly created by a forming planet, is also confirmed by the detection of sulphur monoxide, indicating a shockwaves propagating through the gas disk.

Circumstellar disk
Coronagraphic optical observations with the Hubble Space Telescope show complex spiral patterns in the circumstellar disk. The causes of these structures remain uncertain, although spirals are consistent with the instabilities caused by forming planets. The disk colors are similar to those derived for Kuiper Belt objects, suggesting that the same weathering processes are at work in HD 100546. The disk is fairly flat, consistent with an advanced evolutionary state, and have a wide gap at 40–150 AU radii, possibly carved by the outer planet in the gap.

Spectroscopic analysis of mid-IR data taken from OSCIR on the 4 m Blanco Telescope at Cerro Tololo Inter-American Observatory indicates the presence of a small particles (10–18 μm) containing silicates.  The material is found at distances out to 17 AU away from the star and has a temperature of approximately 227 K.

See also
 List of star extremes
 List of exoplanet extremes
 Jupiter, the largest planet in the solar system

References

Notes

Further reading

External links
 Astronomy picture of the day - May 2, 2001

Lower Centaurus Crux
Musca (constellation)
B-type main-sequence stars
100546
056379
CD-69 00893
TIC objects
Hypothetical planetary systems